Songs from the Vanished Frontier is the second studio album by Yellowbirds, the project of Brooklyn-based musician Sam Cohen. Released on by May 5, 2013, it was well received by critics, with Allmusic giving it 4/5 stars. Eric Danton of Rolling Stone gave it a positive review, writing that "the new songs have a hazy summertime feel on arrangements that surround Cohen's reverb-soaked vocals with jangling guitars, propulsive basslines and lush string charts."

Track listing

Personnel
Yellowbirds - band

References

External links

2013 albums
Yellowbirds albums